John Lilley is an American guitarist and singer songwriter, best known for being a member of rock band The Hooters.

John Lilley may also refer to:

 John Lilley (ice hockey) (born 1972), American ice hockey player
 John Lilley (soldier) (1826–1902), Medal of Honor recipient
 John M. Lilley (born 1939), university administrator

See also
 Jon Lilley (born 1947), former Australian rules footballer
 John Lilly (disambiguation)
 John Lillie (disambiguation)